The Cambridge Rindge and Latin School, also known as CRLS or "Rindge," is a public high school in Cambridge, Massachusetts, United States. It is a part of the Cambridge Public School District. In 1977, two separate schools, the Rindge Technical School and Cambridge High and Latin School, merged to form the Cambridge Rindge and Latin School. The newly built high school at the time increased its capacity to more than 2,000 students from all four grades.

The school is divided into 'Learning Communities.' The Learning Communities are called C, R, L, and S. Until June 2000, the subdivisions were called Houses: Pilot, Fundamental, House A, Academy, Leadership, and the Rindge School of Technical Arts or RSTA. In 1990, RSTA became a "house" within the main CRLS school. The "Houses" then temporarily became "Schools"  (called schools 1/2/3/4/5).  In 2004 the schools transitioned to become "Learning Communities" C (formerly school 1), R(formerly school 2), L(formerly school 3), and S(formerly school 5).

The High School Extension Program, at the site of the old Longfellow School, just down Broadway, offers a nontraditional approach to the high school learning process, handling only 60–100 students at a time. In 2009 and 2010, the building became a temporary freshman academy to accommodate renovations.

CRLS is noted for its diversity in regards to academic achievement in which students of all academic levels take the same courses.

Beginning in 2003, the City of Cambridge mobilized an ambitious plan to renovate the high school. The project was claimed to be "the first major renovation and refurbishing of the 35-year-old [sic] high school building." The project continued to be pushed back, due to state funding issues and other obstructions along the way.  In 2006, the state announced a return in funding, and by the Spring 2007 the School Committee started looking at wider ranging renovations for the building. The renovations were undertaken in 2009-2011.

History

CRLS is actually several separate schools combined into a greater whole. In 1642, the year Harvard College's first class of nine young men graduated, the General Court made it the duty of Cambridge to require that parents and masters properly educate their children or be fined if they neglected to do so. (Girls, however, did not usually attend public schools until 1789, when Boston voted that "children of both sexes" should be taught in the reading and writing schools of their newly reorganized system.) In 1648, Cambridge set up a public grammar school, Master Elijah Corlett's "lattin schoole," making Cambridge the fifth town (after Boston, Charlestown, Dorchester, and Salem) in the Massachusetts Bay Colony to do so. Corlett's schoolhouse came into the possession of Old Cambridge in 1660, and over the next century was succeeded by several new buildings. The public school that evolved from Cortlett's original was a "grammar school" in a double sense: an English grammar school for Old Cambridge and a Latin grammar school (teaching the rudiments of Latin and Greek) for all Cambridge. The school generally aimed to prepare students for admission to college:

“And by the side of the colledge a faire GRAMMAR Schoole, for the training up of young Schollars, and fitting of them for ACADEMICALL LEARNING, that still as they are judged ripe, they may be received into the colledge of this Schoole. Master CORLETT is the Mr., who hath very well approved himselfe for his abilities, dexterity and painfulness in teaching and education of the youth under him.”

By 1832, public schools in Cambridge were open to girls as well as boys. In 1838, Cambridgeport organized a public high school to serve all of Cambridge at the corner of Broadway and Windsor Streets. However, since the location was not easily accessible to either Old Cambridge or East Cambridge, most of the new high schools' students were drawn from Cambridgeport. In 1843, Old Cambridge set up the Female High School, and East Cambridge completed its Otis schoolhouse. Not until 1848 did plans to merge the high schools of the three competitive wards overcome sectional differences. This marked the origin of the Cambridge High School, which began in a new building erected at the corner of Amory and Summer streets and was immediately flooded with over 135 applicants.

The Cambridge High School was divided in 1886: its classical department became the Cambridge Latin School and its remaining departments the Cambridge English High School. The English High School was located at the corner of Broadway and Fayette Streets, while the Latin School was transferred to the Lee Street church, which had been renovated to receive it. At the time of the separation, the high school contained 515 pupils, and 16 teachers. Six teachers and 165 pupils went to the Latin school. In September 1888, the Cambridge Manual Training School for Boys (to become Rindge Tech), founded and maintained by Frederick Hastings Rindge, was opened to the boys of the English High School. In 1892, the English High School moved into a commodious new building on Broadway; Rindge had presented the land to Cambridge at a cost of $230,000. The EHS's old building at Broadway and Fayette was remodeled, and the Latin School moved in. By 1896, the Latin School had grown so quickly that plans were underway for another new building (cost approx. $250,000) that would stand on land adjacent to the English High School building and the Public Library.

In 1977, Cambridge High & Latin and the Rindge School of Technical Arts and were merged into Cambridge Rindge and Latin, or CRLS. The old Cambridge High & Latin building was demolished in 1980, but the old granite lintel and doorway frame have been put in place at the corner of Ellery Street and Broadway as a commemorative archway, leading into the grassy fields of Joan Lorentz Park.

In 2001 there was an attempt to restructure the Cambridge Rindge & Latin school under headmaster Paula Evans, which had found controversy. She resigned shortly afterwards. After her resignation she began efforts to create a charter school, which became the Community Charter School of Cambridge (CCSC). Colleen Walsh of the Boston Globe said that Evans's charter school efforts "touched off a firestorm" and that "many people" were upset at her because they perceived that she had abandoned Cambridge Rindge & Latin.

Controversy
During the late 1980s and early 1990s, the school was subject to multiple accusations of inherent racism in its infrastructure, which led to the disbanding of the original houses, as well as the changing of the original school mascot from a bust of a Native American to a  falcon and their name from Warriors to Falcons after concerns about the racist history of the mascot. Students entered their ideas and then voted for the new mascot in a school wide contest. The graduating class of '90 went from wearing brown and gold and Native American warrior and being called The Mighty Warriors to wearing black and silver and a falcon and being called Falcons [or Gyrfalcons.]

The Register Forum
The school's newspaper is Register Forum.  It was first founded in 1891 as the C.M.T.S Register, the name was further changed to the Rindge Register, and in 1977, when the two public high schools in the city merged, their papers merged as well. The Cambridge Latin Forum merged with the Rindge Register to become The Register Forum. The Register Forum now publishes 10 editions per year at the end of each month, September to June. Those editions range from 8 to 24 pages, and focus on events around the school. The paper was formerly printed at The Harvard Crimson press, but has since moved production to out of state facilities due to cost restraints.

Athletics
Athletics have always played a major part in the school's extracurricular activity structure. The 11 fall and winter sports take place between September and Thanksgiving (the day of the football team's final game), and between the first Monday following Thanksgiving and February or March. The ten spring sports start on the third Monday in March, and finish in late May.

Arts
CRLS has an extensive arts program, with an emphasis on visual and performing arts. The school has programs in photography, graphic design, fine arts, pottery, a modern dance company, Falcon Band, Big Band Jazz Ensemble and a string orchestra.

Notable alumni

 Ben Affleck (1990), actor, director, and screenwriter
 Matt Damon (1988), actor and screenwriter
 Casey Affleck (1993), actor 
 Nate Albert, musician Mighty Mighty Bosstones, record executive
 Leroy Anderson, composer
 Orson Bean, actor
 Lukas Biewald, entrepreneur
 Traci Bingham, actress and model
 Maxime Bôcher (1883), mathematician
 Walter Brennan, actor and three-time Academy Award winner
 Max Casella, (1985) actor, The Sopranos and Doogie Howser, M.D.
 Peggy Cass, actress and comedian
 David Chu, Hong Kong politician
 Jeremy Collins, Winner, Sole Survivor of Survivor: Cambodia
 Eric Cornell, 2001 Nobel Prize in Physics
 Bronson Crothers, pediatric neurologist
 E. E. Cummings, poet
 Bill de Blasio, the Mayor of New York City
 Patrick Ewing, (1981) NCAA Basketball Champion and current head coach of the Georgetown Hoyas, legendary center for the New York Knicks, and member of the Basketball Hall of Fame
 Jessica Garretson Finch (1893), author, suffragette, founding President of Finch College.
 Helen Lee Franklin (1895 – 1949), teacher and social justice advocate
 Gina Grant, known for gaining early admission to Harvard University, only to have it revoked when it was revealed that she had killed her mother
 Vernon Grant, cartoonist
 Sian Heder, writer/director of CODA (2021 film) and other films
 Emanuel D. Molyneaux Hewlett, one of the first African American attorneys to argue before the United States Supreme Court
 Karl Hobbs, former head coach of the George Washington University Colonials basketball team
 Charles "Charlie" Jenkins, Winner of two gold medals at the 1956 Summer Olympics in Melbourne, Australia
 D. D. Kosambi, mathematician, statistician, Marxist historian of India, and polymath
 Rev. Ashley Day Leavitt, pastor, Harvard Congregational Church, Brookline, Massachusetts
 Tom and Ray Magliozzi, aka Click and Clack, the Tappet Brothers, hosts of NPR's Car Talk
 Paul F. O'Rourke, public health advisor
 Walter Pierce, director of Celebrity Series of Boston
 Rumeal Robinson, NCAA Basketball Champion at Michigan and NBA player
 Harold Russell, World War II veteran and Academy Award winner
 William Russell, youngest person ever elected Governor of Massachusetts
 Walter J. Sullivan, Massachusetts politician
 John Thomas, set several world records in the high jump. Winner of Bronze medal at 1960 Summer Olympics in Rome & Silver medal at 1964 Summer Olympics in Tokyo. 
 Jean Tatlock, psychiatrist, communist, and writer who was romantically involved with J. Robert Oppenheimer
 Dzhokhar Tsarnaev, and Tamerlan Tsarnaev, Boston Marathon bombers - Philip Martin of WGBH described them as the school's "most infamous graduates".
 Korczak Ziółkowski, sculptor of the Crazy Horse Memorial
 Eddie Waitkus, former Major League Baseball player
 William MacHarrie (1961 - CHLS), Retired US Army LtCol and former NATO Signal Brigade Commander; awards include the Legion of Merit and Bronze Star

References

External links

CRLS homepage
Cambridge Public School Department homepage
The CRLS Sub-Community of CambridgePublic, an unofficial information and discussion site
Notable Cambridge Alumni
Cambridge Rindge and Latin School Performance Information
In Memoriam: Cambridge High and Latin School + Class of 1969 Yearbook Project

Educational institutions established in the 1640s
Buildings and structures in Cambridge, Massachusetts
Schools in Middlesex County, Massachusetts
Public high schools in Massachusetts
1648 establishments in Massachusetts
Educational institutions established in 1977
1977 establishments in Massachusetts